Colin Anderson (born 31 August 1951) is a former Australian rules footballer who played for the Melbourne Football Club in the Victorian Football League (VFL). Originally from the Mulwala Football Club which competed in the Murray Football League, Anderson was listed with Melbourne from 1969 to 1972. He made his VFL debut in the round 10 match against  at Arden Street Oval where he was named as a ruck rover and was retained in the side the next week in the match against  at Junction Oval for his final VFL match, in which he totalled two senior games for his career. He was transferred to the Glenelg Football Club in the South Australian National Football League (SANFL) in 1973 where he went on to play 90 games and kick 93 goals. He was also a professional sprinter where he won the 1975 Bendigo Two Thousand race. Following his career with Glenelg, he became a playing coach at Wagga in the Farrer Football League in 1976 where he led the Wagga Tigers Firsts to 3 consecutive Grand Finals, winning the first two in 1977 and 1978. Coach John Halbert dropped him the morning of the GF into the reserves in favour of an untried shorter player, Tony McInnes, debuting into the 1st’s in the GF. The 1st’s lost and the Glenelg Reserves took the flag. A bitter-sweet end to Anderson’s career with the Bays.
pla

Notes

External links 

1951 births
Living people
Australian rules footballers from New South Wales
Melbourne Football Club players
Glenelg Football Club players